Extremaduran may refer to:

Something related to Extremadura, an autonomous community in western Spain, including:
 The Extremaduran language, a language spoken in Northwestern areas of Extremadura
 The Extremaduran dialect of Spanish, spoken in most of Extremadura
 Extremadurans, the people of Extremadura

See also
Estremadura (disambiguation)

Language and nationality disambiguation pages